Jacques Bascou (born 13 March 1953 in Castelnaudary, Aude) was a member of the National Assembly of France and represented Aude's 2nd constituency from 1997 to 2012. The mayor of Narbonne, he is a member of the Socialist Party and belongs to the SRC parliamentary group.

References

1953 births
Living people
People from Castelnaudary
Politicians from Occitania (administrative region)
Socialist Party (France) politicians
Deputies of the 11th National Assembly of the French Fifth Republic
Deputies of the 12th National Assembly of the French Fifth Republic
Deputies of the 13th National Assembly of the French Fifth Republic
Mayors of places in Occitania (administrative region)
People from Narbonne